Brendan Peyper (born 7 August 1996) is a South African singer-songwriter. He released his debut album Stop, wag, bly nog 'n bietjie in 2015 and then a follow-up album Hy Loop Oop in 2017.

Career
Brendan Peyper was born in Bloemfontein in a farming family. He studied at Hoërskool Jim Fouché with plans to study sound engineering. He started playing guitar at the age of five and began his professional career in music at age 14. He attracted audiences early on with sincere, infectious lyrics.

His first single, Stop, wag, bly nog 'n bietjie, was a success with Channel 24 dubbing it the hottest music video. He followed it up with Tafelberg vir Twee light accompanied by a new music video with good following.

Discography

Album

Singles
2015: "Stop, wag, bly nog 'n bietjie" 
2015: "Tafelberg vir twee"
2015: "Die perfekte een vir my"
2017: "Twee is beter as een"
2017: "Vanaand sê ek net ja"
2018: "We Got Forever"
2018: "Klim Jou Everest"
2018: "Jy Laat Dit Maklik Lyk"
2018: "Maak Die Perde Los"
2018: "Like a River Flows"
2020: "Sterk Soos 'n Leeu"
2020: "Lekkerder Op My Trekker"
2021: "Dik en dun"
2021: "Op jou spoor"
2021: "Warm nog op"

Awards and nominations

References

External links
Official website

1996 births
Living people
Afrikaner people
South African pop singers
Afrikaans-language singers
South African people of Dutch descent